Nicolas Farina (born 9 August 1986) is a French former professional footballer who played mainly as a winger.

Club career
Farina began his career at FC Metz and was loaned out to AS Cannes in 2007–08. After a few years with FC Metz, he was released and signed on 2 July 2009 with Évian Thonon Gaillard FC. For the 2012–13 season, Farina, along with fellow Evian player Guillaume Rippert was loaned to German 2. Bundesliga side FC Energie Cottbus. He later signed with Racing FC from the Luxembourg National Division in January 2015.

After a brief spell together in Romania with FC Petrolul Ploiești, Farina and Rippert joined up again in January 2016, at SO Cholet in Championnat de France Amateur, where he won promotion.

Honours
Metz
Ligue 2: 2006–07
Evian
Ligue 2: 2010–11
Championnat National: 2009–10

References

External links

1985 births
Living people
French footballers
FC Metz players
AS Cannes players
Thonon Evian Grand Genève F.C. players
FC Energie Cottbus players
Racing FC Union Luxembourg players
FC Petrolul Ploiești players
SO Cholet players
Ligue 1 players
Ligue 2 players
Championnat National players
2. Bundesliga players
Liga I players
French expatriate footballers
Expatriate footballers in Romania
Expatriate footballers in Germany
Expatriate footballers in Luxembourg
Footballers from Metz
Association football defenders
French expatriate sportspeople in Luxembourg
French expatriate sportspeople in Germany
French expatriate sportspeople in Romania